Grove Oak is a small unincorporated community in DeKalb County, Alabama, United States. It is located atop Sand Mountain in northeastern Alabama.

Grove Oak has one store, and is surrounded by forests and farmland. There are two Baptist churches. There is a small Masonic lodge and a now-closed junior high school. It also has a restaurant that has been in and out of business several times.

Until about the mid-1970s, it was the center of a farming community and had its own cotton gin. Today, farming is not so much the focus, and most working members of the Grove Oak community drive to factories or other jobs in the larger towns nearby. Limited farming, cattle, and poultry raising takes place in and around the town.

Geography

Notable persons
Albert Rains, U.S. Representative from 1945 to 1965

References

Unincorporated communities in Alabama
Unincorporated communities in DeKalb County, Alabama